Ellen White is an English former professional footballer who played for both England and Great Britain between 2010 and 2022, and scored 58 international goals during that time. For England, White scored 52 goals in 113 international appearances, making her the country's all-time top scorer. She surpassed Kelly Smith's record of 46 goals by scoring the third goal out of 20 against Latvia in a 2023 FIFA Women's World Cup qualifying match, which was part of a record win for any senior England team.

White made her international debut for England on 25 March 2010 in a 3−0 home win over Austria, scoring the third goal in the 2011 FIFA Women's World Cup qualification match. England manager Hope Powell, who gave White her debut, was unsurprised that she scored on her debut, referencing her attitude, hard work and her commitment to being one of the best. A regular during her England career, White won the 2022 UEFA Women's Championship, England's first major women's tournament. She scored her first international hat-trick for England on 23 February 2021 in a home friendly against Northern Ireland, a game which England won 6−0 at St George's Park, Burton upon Trent. She scored a second hat-trick for England against Latvia in November 2021, and a single hat-trick for Great Britain against Australia at the 2020 Summer Olympics. White scored her final goal for England in a 8−0 win over Norway during the group-stage of the 2022 UEFA Women's Championship. She announced her international retirement on 22 August 2022, following the final of the 2022 Euros.

White played for Great Britain at two Summer Olympic tournaments. She made her Olympic debut in a 1−0 win over New Zealand at the 2012 tournament hosted by the United Kingdom. She played all four matches for Great Britain at the tournament before her team was knocked out by Canada in a 2−0 defeat during the quarter-final. At the 2020 Summer Olympics, held during 2021 in Tokyo, Japan, White scored six goals, leaving as the joint-second top goalscorer behind Dutch striker Vivianne Miedema with ten goals. Although she scored a hat-trick, Great Britain left the tournament following a quarter-final defeat against Australia after extra time.

Goals
Scores and results list her team's goal tally first, score column indicates score after each White goal.

Hat-tricks

Statistics

See also
 List of women's footballers with 100 or more international caps
 List of top international women's football goal scorers by country
 Lists of hat-tricks
 List of international goals scored by Kelly Smith

References

White, Ellen
England women's national football team
Women's association football records and statistics
Great Britain women's Olympic football team
Association football in England lists